Morozovo is a rural locality (a selo) in Gubkinsky District, Belgorod Oblast, Russia. The population was 565 as of 2010. There are 7 streets.

Geography 
Morozovo is located 41 km southwest of Gubkin (the district's administrative centre) by road. Nikanorovka is the nearest rural locality.

References 

Rural localities in Gubkinsky District